Given a coupled DEVS model, simulation algorithms are methods to generate the model's legal behaviors, which are a set of trajectories not to reach illegal states. (see behavior of a Coupled DEVS model.) [Zeigler84] originally introduced the algorithms that handle time variables related to lifespan  and elapsed time  by introducing two other time variables, last event time, and next event time  with the following relations: 

and

where  denotes the current time. And the remaining time,

  is equivalently computed as
 apparently .
Based on these relationships, the algorithms to simulate the behavior of a given Coupled DEVS are written as follows.

Algorithm 

 algorithm DEVS-coordinator
   Variables:
      parent // parent coordinator
      : // time of last event
      : // time of next event
       // the associated Coupled DEVS model
     when receive init-message(Time t)
         for each  do
             send init-message(t) to child 
         ;
         ;
     when receive star-message(Time t)
         if  then
             error: bad synchronization;
         
         send star-message(t)to 
         ;
         ;
     when receive x-message(Time t)
         if  and  == false then
             error: bad synchronization;
         for each  do
             send x-message(t) to child 
         ;
         ;
     when receive y-message(Time t)
         for each  do
             send x-message(t) to child 
         if  then
             send y-message(t) to parent;
         ;
         ;

See also 
 Coupled DEVS
 Behavior of Coupled DEVS
 Simulation Algorithms for Atomic DEVS

References 
 [Zeigler84] 
 [ZKP00] 

Algorithms